The Anaho Island National Wildlife Refuge is a wildlife refuge on Anaho Island in Pyramid Lake, Nevada. The refuge was established by President Woodrow Wilson in 1913 as a sanctuary for colonial nesting birds. It is home to one of the two largest colonies of pelicans—American white pelicans—in the western U.S. Other birds found on the island include California gulls, Caspian terns, double-crested cormorants, great blue herons, black-crowned night herons, and snowy egrets.

No boats are allowed within 1000 feet of the refuge. Refuge staff and volunteers visit the island to keep track of birds and band juvenile pelicans. An estimated 8-10,000 pelicans used to return to Anaho Island each spring from their winter homes in Southern California and Baja California, Mexico. In recent years the number of pelican nests have dropped dramatically, due to water diversions affecting the fish runs of the endangered cui-ui, a staple food of the pelican.

References

External links
Refuge website
U.S. Fish & Wildlife Service (slideshow of Anaho Island)

National Wildlife Refuges in Nevada
Protected areas of Washoe County, Nevada